The 2022–23 Brøndby IF season is Brøndby IF's 42nd consecutive season in top-division of the Danish football league, the 33rd consecutive in Danish Superliga, and the 57th as a football club. Besides the Superliga, the club is also competing in the Danish Cup and this season's editions of the UEFA Europa Conference League. It is the fourth season with head coach Niels Frederiksen, after he replaced caretaker manager Martin Retov during the 2019–20 campaign.

Players

Squad information
Players and squad numbers last updated on 5 December 2022. Appearances include all competitions.Note: Flags indicate national team as has been defined under FIFA eligibility rules. Players may hold more than one non-FIFA nationality.

Transfers

In

Out

Competitions

Danish Superliga

League table

Results by round - Regular season

Danish Cup

UEFA Europa Conference League

Statistics

Goalscorers

References

Brøndby IF seasons
Danish football clubs 2022–23 season